Nationality words link to articles with information on the nation's poetry or literature (for instance, Irish or France).

Events
John Milton enters Christ's College, Cambridge.

Works published

Great Britain
 Thomas Heywood:
 Translator, Art of Love, publication year uncertain; published anonymously; translated from Ovid, Ars amatoria
 A Funeral Elegie: Upon the much lamented death of [...] King James
 Francis Quarles, Sions Sonnets (see also Sions Elegies 1624)

Other
 Honorat de Bueil de Racan, Les Bergeries, France
 Honoré d'Urfé, Sylvanire, France

Births
Death years link to the corresponding "[year] in poetry" article:
 Miguel de Barrios (died 1701), Spanish poet and historian
 Dáibhí Ó Bruadair (died 1698), Irish language poet
 John Caryll (died 1711), English poet, dramatist and diplomat
 Samuel Chappuzeau (died 1701), French scholar, author, poet and playwright
 Marusia Churai (died 1689), semi-mythical Ukrainian Baroque composer, poet and singer
 Jacques de Coras (died 1677), French poet and minister
 Moses ben Mordecai Zacuto (died 1697), kabalistic writer and poet
 Katarina Zrinska (died 1673), Croatian noblewoman and poet

Deaths
Birth years link to the corresponding "[year] in poetry" article:
 March 26 – Giambattista Marino (born 1569), Italian poet famous for his long epic L'Adone
 August 29 (bur.) – John Fletcher (born 1579), English dramatist and poet
 September – Thomas Lodge (born 1558), English dramatist, writer and physician
 September 20 – Heinrich Meibom (born 1555), German historian and poet
 October 10 – Arthur Gorges (born 1569), English poet, translator, courtier and naval captain
 Israel ben Moses Najara (born 1555), Hebrew poet in Palestine (Ottoman Empire)
 Adrianus Valerius (born 1570), Dutch

See also

 Poetry
 16th century in poetry
 16th century in literature

Notes

17th-century poetry
Poetry